Poveda is a surname. Notable people with the surname include:

Alfredo Poveda (1926-1990), interim President of Ecuador
Arcadio Poveda (born 1930), Mexican astronomer 
Christian Poveda (1955-2009), French photojournalist and film director
Darío Poveda (born 1997), Spanish footballer
Miguel Poveda (born 1973), Spanish flamenco singer
Pedro Poveda Castroverde (1874-1936), Spanish priest and martyr

Spanish-language surnames